Tygarts State Forest is a state forest in Carter County, Kentucky, United States. The  forest was established in 1957, near Carter Caves State Resort Park.

References

Kentucky state forests
Protected areas of Carter County, Kentucky
Protected areas established in 1957
1957 establishments in Kentucky